Philip Berger Jr. (born March 26, 1972) is an American attorney and jurist, currently serving as an associate justice of the North Carolina Supreme Court.

Berger was elected to a seat on the North Carolina Court of Appeals in 2016, defeating incumbent Judge Linda Stephens. In the 2020 North Carolina judicial elections, while still serving on that court, he was elected as a Republican to an eight-year term to begin January 1, 2021, as a justice of the North Carolina Supreme Court, taking the seat formerly held by Justice Paul Martin Newby and defeating a fellow Court of Appeals Judge Lucy Inman.

Berger's father is longtime North Carolina Senate President Pro Tempore Phil Berger. Berger formerly served as district attorney in Rockingham County, North Carolina and as an administrative law judge. He was an unsuccessful candidate for Congress in 2014.

References

1972 births
21st-century American judges
District attorneys in North Carolina
Justices of the North Carolina Supreme Court
Living people
North Carolina Court of Appeals judges
North Carolina Republicans
Wake Forest University School of Law alumni